The Harford Mall is a shopping mall owned by CBL & Associates Properties that is located near the junction of Maryland Route 24 and U.S. Route 1, about  north of Baltimore, in Bel Air, Maryland, United States.  Its anchor is Macy's.  It is the only shopping mall in Harford County, Maryland. The mall was built on the previous site of the Bel Air Racetrack.

History
Originally opened in 1973 by Mid Atlantic Realty Trust, it featured an E.J. Korvette and Montgomery Ward as its anchor stores. Korvette became Hutzler's then Hecht's, and finally Macy's. Another early tenant was an F.W. Woolworth Company store in center court. Sears replaced Montgomery Ward. The Harford Mall was purchased by CBL & Associates Property, Inc. in 2003 for $71 million.  Hochschild Kohn was opened during the first expansion of the mall. The store opened in October 1977.  This later became the original food court.

During the period of 2006 and 2007, the mall underwent an extensive renovation. The center court and the interior of the mall were remodeled, and the exterior was also given a facelift. The original indoor food court was entirely removed in favor of additional retail space. A new "food court" was constructed outside the mall, at which time new restaurants such as Qdoba, Bonefish Grill, Five Guys, Vaccaros Italian Pastries, and Red Robin moved into the outdoor spaces. In addition, more upscale retailers, such as Hollister (which replaced the former KB Toys and later closed) and American Eagle were also added. In 2013, the mall lost longtime tenant Old Navy, which moved to the new Boulevard at Box Hill shopping center in Abingdon, Maryland and was then replaced by The Shoe Department Encore, and Payless Shoe Source announced plans to close its Harford Mall location in February 2019 as part of the chain's bankruptcy. In the same month, Charlotte Russe also announced plans to close its Harford Mall location along with many other stores across the country. Other eateries located inside the mall include The Greene Turtle, Friendly's,and Pretzel Twister. In early February 2020, Sears, one of Harford Mall's two anchor stores, closed its location at the mall, as a result of its bankruptcy filing.

The mall is located across from what is known as "The Harford Mall Annex", which is a section of retail stores located directly across the street from the mall on Boulton Street, facing one of the entrances to Macy's. Stores located in "The Annex" include Office Depot, Dollar Tree, PetSmart and Banfield Pet Hospital, and Best Buy. These stores are listed in the directory on Harford Mall's website, although they are not physically located inside the mall.

Current anchors 

 Macy's (Acquired Hecht's, 2006-Present)
 Macy's Furniture Gallery (Acquired Hecht's Furniture Gallery, 2006-Present)

Previous anchors 

 Montgomery Ward (Replaced by Sears, 1973-2001)
 Sears (Replaced Montgomery Ward, 2001-2020, Store Demolished 2022)
 Montgomery Ward Auto Center (Replaced by Hecht's Furniture Gallery, Closed 2001)
 Hecht's (Acquired by Macy's in 2006)
 Hecht's Furniture Gallery (Replaced Montgomery Ward Auto Center, 2001-2006)

Shops at Harford Mall 

In November of 2021, it was announced that the Sears store, which closed in early 2020, would be demolished in order to build a 59,600 square foot outdoor shopping complex outside of the mall. Demolition of the old Sears store began in early 2022, with demolition completed in March of 2022. The new complex, while adjacent to the mall, will not be physically connected to the mall. One of the primary tenants is expected to be a Amazon Fresh grocery store",there has also been a confirmed Mediterrenean Grill as an eatery.The Sears store, which opened in 2001, replaced a Montgomery Ward department store that opened with the mall in 1973.

References

External links

Shopping malls in Maryland
Buildings and structures in Bel Air, Harford County, Maryland
Tourist attractions in Harford County, Maryland
Shopping malls established in 1973
1973 establishments in Maryland
CBL Properties